Clach Glas is a mountain on the Black Cuillin of the Isle of Skye, Scotland. Its elevation is 786 m (2,579 ft) and the name translates as The Grey Stone. It is often traversed as a sustained scrambling route to Blà Bheinn, mostly at a standard between Easy and Moderate, depending on the line followed (see Parker, routes 101 & 102). It is the penultimate mountain in the Greater Traverse of the Black Cuillin.

Ashley Abraham called it 'the Matterhorn of Skye', (a description which is often still used).

According to some sources the first ascent of the top was probably not until 1888 by Charles Pilkington and party.

References

Slesser M, (1975), The Island of Skye, SMC District Guide, 
Parker, J. Wilson, (1983), Scrambles in Skye, Cicerone Press, 

Mountains and hills of the Isle of Skye
Corbett Tops